Philip was the name of several Macedonian monarchs:

 Philip I of Macedon (ruled 640–602 BC)
 Philip II of Macedon (382–336 BC), ruled 359-336 BC, father of Alexander the Great
 Philip III of Macedon (c. 359–317 BC), ruled 323-317 BC
 Philip IV of Macedon (died 297 BC)
 Philip V of Macedon (238 BC - 179 BC), ruled 221–179 BC